Lucrecia Hernández Mack (born November 16, 1973) is a Guatemalan physician and politician. In July 2016, she became the first woman to head the Ministry of Public Health and Social Assistance of Guatemala. In 2017, she resigned from her position in protest over President Jimmy Morales ordering the expulsion of United Nations anti-corruption investigator Iván Velásquez Gómez.

She has worked as a consultant in several international organizations such as the Pan American Health Organization and the World Health Organization.

Biography
She studied medicine at the Universidad de San Carlos de Guatemala. She also obtained a master's degree in Public Health at Rafael Landívar University.

She protested the presidency of Otto Pérez Molina.

Minister of Health
On July 27, 2016, she was appointed to replace Alfonso Cabrera as Minister of Public Health. Cabrera had announced his stepping down the week before, citing personal and health reasons.

Hernández resigned in response to the President's call for expulsion of Iván Valásquez. Velásquez at the time was serving as the head of the International Commission against Impunity in Guatemala. She accused President Morales of being in favor of "impunity". Three vice-ministers, Adrián Chávez, Juan Carlos Verdugo Urrejola, and Édgar Rolando González Barreno, resigned with her.

Personal life
She is the daughter of Myrna Mack, a Guatemalan anthropologist. In 1990, her mother was killed by a military death squad because of her criticism of the Guatemala government's treatment of the indigenous Maya peoples. Her mother's death later lead to a court case, Myrna Mack Chang v. Guatemala, where her family received compensation by the state.

Publications
 Transformando el sistema público de salud desde el primer nivel de atención. (2012). Lucrecia Hernández Mack, César Sánchez, Juan Carlos Verdugo, Lidia Morales, Carmen Alicia Arriaga, Zully Hernández. Instituto de Salud Incluyente y Médicos Mundi Navarra.

See also
 Helen Mack Chang

References

Living people
21st-century Guatemalan women politicians
21st-century Guatemalan politicians
1973 births
Women government ministers of Guatemala
Guatemalan feminists
Guatemalan people of Chinese descent
Guatemalan people of Maya descent
People from Guatemala City